Familiar Ground is the fifth album by Sean T. It was released on April 16, 2002 for Perrion Records and was produced entirely by Sean T.

Track listing
"Bomb First" - 3:34
"Earn Your Strips" - 4:13
"Mercenaries" - 3:46
"Bounce to This" - 3:30
"Dirty Game" - 3:54
"Chopping Game" - 2:29
"Tricks" - 3:13
"Gangstas Ride Deep" - 4:07
"Married to Tha Game" - 4:20
"Mo Murder Mo Drama" - 4:33
"Skit" - 4:10
"Halla at Me" - 4:22
"Ballers Party" - 4:27
"Out to Get It" - 4:04
"Balia" - 3:10

2002 albums
Sean T albums